Liushi is a town of Yueqing, Zhejiang, China. , it has nine residential communities and 158 villages under its administration.

References

Township-level divisions of Zhejiang
Yueqing